Warren “Charlie” Monk (born 5 February 1940) is a former international speedway rider from Australia.

Speedway career 
Monk won a bronze medal at the Speedway World Team Cup in the 1965 Speedway World Team Cup when he represented Great Britain (during the time period when Oceania riders were allowed to represent Britain).

He rode in the top tier of British Speedway riding primarily for Glasgow Tigers. He was a four times British/Commonwealth finalist and also represented Scotland in test matches.

World final appearances

World Team Cup
 1965 -  Kempten* (with Barry Briggs / Nigel Boocock / Ken McKinlay / Jimmy Gooch) - 3rd - 18pts (1)
*Note: Monk rode for Great Britain in the World Team Cup

References 

1940 births
Living people
Australian speedway riders
Edinburgh Monarchs riders
Halifax Dukes riders
Glasgow Tigers riders
Long Eaton Archers riders
Neath Welsh Dragons riders
Sheffield Tigers riders
Sportspeople from Adelaide